All the Rage: Saved by Sarno is a 2016 documentary film directed by Michael Galinsky. It focuses on physician John E. Sarno.

The film interviewed Howard Stern and Larry David who had previously spoke for Sarno's theories and books.

Reception
Ken Jaworoski of The New York Times wrote a positive review of the film, writing, "“All the Rage” overrides most of its shortcomings by keeping a breezy tone and by showing Dr. Sarno to be a convincing speaker, as well as an affable and somewhat crusty character." David Klein of Indy Week also wrote a positive review of the film, calling it "rich and multilayered".

Sam Fragoso of TheWrap was more critical of the film, calling it "a movie about two people that ends up being about no one at all." Walter Addiego of SFGATE wrote the film a mixed review, writing, "The film was clearly a labor of love, for good or ill. At one point, Galinsky jokingly refers to the production as “semi-unprofessional.” This is unusual and welcome frankness from a moviemaker."
 The film received mixed reviews in the Los Angeles Times and The Village Voice.

References

External links
 
 

American documentary films
2016 documentary films